The Vampire Lestat (1985) is a vampire novel by American writer Anne Rice, the second in her Vampire Chronicles, following Interview with the Vampire (1976). The story is told from the point of view of the vampire Lestat de Lioncourt as narrator, while Interview is narrated by Louis de Pointe du Lac. Several events in the two books appear to contradict each other, allowing the reader to decide which version of events they believe to be accurate.

Plot summary
The book opens with Lestat coming out of the ground in the 1980s after a decades long sleep, awakened by a Rock and Roll band named "Satan's night out." He reveals he is a vampire to them, but they think he is joking, as in this universe Interview with the Vampire has been published as a novel. He then decides to become a rock star and reveal vampires to humans. But first, he decides to write an autobiography, which makes up the majority of the rest of the book.

His in-universe autobiography opens with him, an impoverished noble in the 18th century Auvergne countryside, killing a pack of wolves. His mother tells him she is dying soon after, and encourages him to see Nicolas de Lenfent, a violinist who has been to Paris. He does so, and they become lovers. They escape to Paris to become actors, gaining a job at a theater. Lestat is kidnapped and bitten by the reclusive elder vampire Magnus, who kills himself that night but leaves Lestat with a castle and a vast fortune. Lestat abandons Nicolas for fear of causing him harm and shuns his loved ones. Instead, he showers them with gifts and riches from his newfound wealth as a means to compensate for his new hermetic lifestyle. Lestat's mother, Gabrielle, dying of consumption, arrives to see him. In order to save her, Lestat transforms her into a vampire. The pair run afoul of the Children of Darkness, a coven of devil-worshipping vampires led by Armand, who attack them and kidnaps Nicolas to punish them for breaking vampire law. Lestat and Gabrielle rescue Nicolas. After a heated debate with Armand, Lestat causes the coven to dissolve by denouncing the old ways and encouraging the cultists to modernize. Lestat later turns Nicolas into a vampire, but the transformation drives him mad, and his resentment of Lestat quickly destroys their relationship. Severely depressed, Nicolas later commits suicide by throwing himself into a ceremonial bonfire. Armand "shows" Lestat the history of how he was made by the vampire Marius de Romanus. Compelled by the idea of Marius, Lestat leaves messages carved into rock in numerous places while traveling with Gabrielle, hoping Marius will see them and find Lestat.

Whilst in Egypt, abandoned by Gabrielle, Lestat sleeps in the ground after being burned by the sun. He is recovered by Marius and is taken to his secret Mediterranean island. There, Marius shares his past with Lestat, and shows him the progenitors of all vampires—Those Who Must Be Kept—Akasha and Enkil. Marius leaves on a short outing and gives a warning to Lestat not to see them without him. But Lestat feels compelled to do so, and takes Nicolas's old violin and plays for the King and Queen, awakening them. Akasha feeds from Lestat as Lestat feeds from her. Enkil, furious and jealous, attacks and nearly kills Lestat. He is saved by Marius and sent away on the advice of Marius to live one "human" lifetime.

The next section of the book is Interview from Lestat's perspective. He recounts his love for Louis and remorse at turning Claudia into a vampire. He also gives conflicting accounts, saying he only ever drank from evildoers. After Louis and Claudia attack and leave him, he goes to Armand for blood to heal his wounds. Armand refuses, though, and makes him testify against Claudia and later pushes him out of a tower window to stop him from seeing Louis. Lestat returns to New Orleans, and gives another conflicting account of the end of Interview, saying he never spoke with Louis, only Armand. He wastes away only drinking from animals for several years, before going to sleep in the earth.

The book returns to the present, with Lestat being a famous rockstar. He gets several threats from other vampires but dismisses them and has a concert. On the eve of it, Louis finds him and they share a forgiving and romantic reunion. He proceeds with the concert, with Louis waiting backstage. After, they attempt to drive back to their hideout, but several vampires attack them and their car gets lit on fire. Gabrielle appears with another, and drives them back. It is then revealed that Lestat's concert has awakened Akasha, and the book ends on a cliffhanger as he feels her next to him.

Publication
The Vampire Lestat was released on October 31, 1985. Told from the point of view of Lestat, who was previously introduced in Interview with the Vampire, the novel explores the titular vampire's backstory. The Vampire Lestat also reinforces and expands upon Rice's vampire mythology, and The New York Times critic Michiko Kakutani noted, "We learn lots of 'facts' about vampires and vampire culture. We learn that they cry tears of blood, that they're capable of reading other people's minds, that they can be destroyed by fire and sunlight. We learn that 'no vampire may ever destroy another vampire, except that the coven master has the power of life and death over all of his flock'; and we learn that 'no vampire shall ever reveal his true nature to a mortal and allow that mortal to live'."

Adaptations

Anne Rice's The Vampire Lestat
The Vampire Lestat was adapted into a comic and released as a 12-part miniseries by Innovation Comics in 1990 and 1991. The comic, which was formally titled Anne Rice's The Vampire Lestat and featured Daerick Gross and Mike Okamoto as lead artists, had a script adapted from the novel by Rice and Faye Perozich. In 1991 the entire series was published as a graphic novel by Ballantine.

Queen of the Damned
Parts of The Vampire Lestat and The Queen of the Damned were loosely adapted into the 2002 film, Queen of the Damned. The film was seen to be a critical failure, and disappointed some viewers. Rice herself dismissed the film. On her Facebook page, any time the subject was brought up, she repeatedly commented that The Queen of the Damned film is not something she could understand or embrace, that she encouraged them not to do the film and that it hurt her to see her work "mutilated" the way it was.

Lestat: The Musical
The novel formed the basis for the short-lived 2006 Broadway show Lestat. The musical, which was composed by Elton John and Bernie Taupin and written by Linda Woolverton, had a pre-Broadway tryout in California in late 2005 and ran for a total of 33 previews and 39 official performances at the Palace Theater in New York.

Future
In November 2016, Rice announced on Facebook that the rights to her novels were reverted to her despite earlier plans for other adaptations. Rice said that she and her son Christopher would be developing and executive producing a potential television series based on the novels. In April 2017, they teamed up with Paramount Television and Anonymous Content to develop a series. As of early 2018, Bryan Fuller was involved with the creation of a potential TV series based on the novels. On July 17, 2018, it was announced that the series was in development at streaming service Hulu and that Fuller had departed the production. As of December 2019, Hulu's rights had expired and Rice was shopping a package including all film and TV rights to the series. In May 2020, it was announced that AMC had acquired the rights to The Vampire Chronicles and Lives of the Mayfair Witches for developing film and television projects. Anne and Christopher Rice will serve as executive producers on any projects developed.

Audiobooks
There have been three audiobook adaptations of The Vampire Lestat: a 1989 abridged version narrated by Michael York; a 1994 unabridged version narrated by Frank Muller; and a 2011 unabridged version narrated by Simon Vance.

Critical reception
The Vampire Lestat debuted at No. 9 on The New York Times Best Seller list, spending a total of six weeks on the list.  The New York Times critic Michiko Kakutani found Rice's vampire mythology "more compelling than the rest of the novel", and wrote, "While Lestat's not an unlikable vampire ... it's hard to take his dilemmas all that seriously." Kirkus Reviews wrote that "Rice dots Lestat's tale with some marvelous chillers ... vampire bonanza in appropriate dark, humid, spider-web narrative—Rice's specialty" Reviewing the audiobook adaptation, AudioFile wrote that "the plot twists are difficult to follow at times".

Dave Langford reviewed The Vampire Lestat for White Dwarf #86, and stated that "[Rice is] audacious enough to propound an acceptable 'origin story' for vampirism, and to move from dark old Egyptian mysteries to the extremes of twentieth-century Dionysian ecstasy as Lestat gives his first live rock performance. Nice one."

References

External links 
 

The Vampire Chronicles novels
1985 American novels
1985 fantasy novels
1980s LGBT novels
Alfred A. Knopf books
American LGBT novels
Innovation Publishing titles
Novels by Anne Rice
LGBT speculative fiction novels
American fantasy novels adapted into films
Novels with bisexual themes
Male bisexuality in fiction
Novels adapted into comics
Novels set in France